Orfeón is a record label from Mexico, which has released many recordings for the Latin American market since at least the 1950s. During the 1960s, the label signed American rockers Bill Haley & His Comets and the band had numerous regional hits on the label, most notably the partial instrumental "Florida Twist" and the Spanish-language "Twist Espanol". The label also sponsored a musical television series, Orfeón a Go-Go.

Orfeón was affiliated with the Dimsa label in the 1960s, releasing some material (including a number of Haley albums) under this label. Another major American act that recorded for the label was Big Joe Turner in 1966 (his recordings were backed by Haley's Comets, and Turner performed one of the songs along with Haley and the Comets on an episode of Orfeón a Go-Go).

See also 
 List of record labels

References

External links
 Official site

Mexican record labels
Rock and roll record labels